KUEU (90.5 FM) is a radio station  broadcasting a community radio format. Licensed to Logan, Utah, United States, the station serves the Logan area. The station is currently owned by University of Utah. Its parent station (and provider of audio content) is KUER in Salt Lake City.

History
The station went on the air as KZCL on December 5, 1997. The station changed its call sign to KUEU on December 6, 2011.

References

External links

UEU
Radio stations established in 1997